Leo Benedikt Gummerus (20 June 1885, Kurkijoki - 16 December 1956) was a Finnish Lutheran clergyman and politician. He was a member of the Parliament of Finland from 1927 to 1929, representing the National Coalition Party.

References

1885 births
1956 deaths
People from Lakhdenpokhsky District
People from Viipuri Province (Grand Duchy of Finland)
20th-century Finnish Lutheran clergy
National Coalition Party politicians
Members of the Parliament of Finland (1927–29)
University of Helsinki alumni